Halvor Heyerdahl Rasch (8 January 1805 – 26 August 1883) was a Norwegian zoologist and educator.

He was born at Eidsberg in Østfold, Norway. Rasch studied  botany and zoology at the University of Christiania (now University of Oslo).
 He was a professor of zoology and natural science  at the University of Oslo from 1852 to 1874, having previously been a lector since 1847.

An avid hunter and sportsman, he published the book Jagten i Norge (1845) as well as works about livestock, oyster cultivation and beekeeping. He was among the founders of the Centralforeningen for Udbredelse af Legemsøvelser og Vaabenbrug, a precursor to the Norwegian Confederation of Sports, in 1861.

Rasch was decorated as a Knight of the Royal Norwegian Order of St. Olav in 1863 and received the Silver Medal of the  Société Impériale Zoologique d'Acclimatation 
at Paris in 1866.

References

1805 births
1883 deaths
People from Eidsberg
University of Oslo alumni
19th-century Norwegian zoologists
Norwegian non-fiction writers
Academic staff of the University of Oslo
19th-century Norwegian writers
 Recipients of the St. Olav's Medal